Kelana Jaya LRT station is a light rail station on the Kelana Jaya Line. It was the former western terminus for passenger services on the line. It is the start of the LRT Extension Project which extended the current terminus to Putra Heights station. It is also the namesake for the LRT line.

The station is located besides the southbound carriageway on the Damansara–Puchong Expressway (LDP) between exit 1108 and 1109, although there is an overhead crossing for pedestrians to cross the highway.

Located nearby are the neighbourhoods of SS2, Kelana Jaya (SS4 and SS5), and Taman Mayang (SS25). As the station is on a major expressway, it is well served by bus connections that take passengers to the areas of PJ Utara (PJU or Northern Petaling Jaya), Tropicana, Subang Jaya, Sunway and Putrajaya. It is also a local taxi hub.

Location and station layout

Kelana Jaya consists of an island platform, with a concourse below. The station building is on the south side of the Damansara–Puchong Expressway (LDP Highway). The car park (Park 'N Ride) and bus stand sit below the concourse and station building. There is a pedestrian overhead bridge linked to the station building. Spanning over the Damansara–Puchong Expressway, it leads to the second exit onto the SS 25/2 road.

The main exit serves parts of SS 4, SS 5 and SS 2 in the northern part of Kelana Jaya. This is where the line and station get their names. Restoran de Rasa Sayang and doudoubake are iconic restaurants in the SS4 commercial zone. A pedestrian walkway with flights of stairs connects the station with the SS 4C/15 road. The second exit caters to the Taman Megah and Taman Mayang locality, especially SS 25. Nearby landmarks include Mayang Oasis, SK Taman Megah, and SJK(C) Yuk Chai.

Architecture
The station is built in a similar design to most of the other above-ground stations on the Kelana Jaya Line. The large roof over the platform level is reminiscent of traditional Malay kampung architectural design.

Bus services

Kelana Jaya LRT station is also a rapidKL bus hub for the surrounding areas of Petaling Jaya. To serve this purpose, there is a major bus stop located opposite the expressway on the northbound carriageway, linked to the station by a pedestrian bridge. Buses depart from the station on the southbound carriageway, but many buses drop their passengers at the bus stop as this avoids congestion in the station bus terminal. This station also offer a bus route to Bandar Utama MRT station.

Bus Services

Feeder buses

Other buses

Gallery

See also
 Kelana Jaya Line

References

External links 

Kelana Jaya LRT Station

Kelana Jaya Line
Railway stations opened in 1998